Europium barium titanate is a chemical compound composed of barium, europium, titanium, and oxygen.  It is magnetic and ferroelectric at i.5 K.

It is a ceramic material which was used in 2010 experiments on a new theory on baryon asymmetry.

References 

Titanates
Barium compounds
Europium(III) compounds
Ferroelectric materials
Perovskites